Samara, also known as the John E. Christian House, is a house designed by Frank Lloyd Wright located in West Lafayette, Indiana.  The home is an example of the Usonian homes that Wright designed.  Samara was built from 1954 to 1956 and was still occupied by the original owner, John E. Christian, until he died on July 12, 2015.

History

In 1950 John and Kay Christian decided to build a home near Purdue University where they both worked, John as a pharmaceutical chemistry professor and Kay as the social director for the university. After much discussion, they decided that Wright was the architect who suited the ideals for their home. Not knowing how to proceed, John phoned Wright directly at his office and was surprisingly able to speak directly to the famed architect. Over the next six years they worked together both with meetings in West Lafayette, Indiana and at Taliesin, Wright's summer home in Spring Green, Wisconsin. The home was named after the samara, which Wright spotted on the property during his first visit. He worked a stylized design of chevron-shaped leaves throughout the design of the home including the clerestory windows, dining chairs and the living room rug. These designs, nicknamed The Winged Seed, are located on the perforated upper windows and were also used on the Bachman-Wilson Usonian home. The house was built to entertain the family's college students; the living room was designed for 50 people. It featured a long couch and room for sitting on the stairs.

The Christian family maintains the home according to the exacting specifications of its architect. As in many of the homes he designed, Wright specified or designed the entire environment, including the furniture, linens and landscaping. The Christians were not initially able to purchase all of the specified custom details; however, they made an agreement with Wright to continue adding to the home as their budget allowed.

The color palette of furniture and design details is brighter and more saturated than other examples of Wright's architecture. This was prompted by Kay Christian who requested brighter colors against Wright's wishes. Wright was finally convinced by his wife, Olgivanna Lloyd Wright, who insisted that she would help the Christians with the color design. The result was a palette of vibrant lime green, magenta, and purple combined with more subdued shades of orange, yellow, and beige (see image at left). The home was designated as a National Historic Landmark in 2015.  The nomination form for the home provides a very detailed overview of the home with pictures and floor plans. It was featured in a mid-2015 exhibit at the Portsmouth Art and Cultural Center.

In 2020 $1 million in grants was acquired to make repairs.

See also
List of National Historic Landmarks in Indiana

References

 Storrer, William Allin. The Frank Lloyd Wright Companion. University Of Chicago Press, 2006,  (S.375)

External links

Frank Lloyd Wright buildings
National Register of Historic Places in Tippecanoe County, Indiana
Museums in Tippecanoe County, Indiana
Houses in Tippecanoe County, Indiana
Historic house museums in Indiana
National Historic Landmarks in Indiana
Houses on the National Register of Historic Places in Indiana